Vinaro Bhagyamu Vishnu Katha is a 2023 Indian Telugu-language romantic action thriller film written and directed by debutant Murali Kishor Abburu and produced by Bunny Vas of GA2 Pictures. The film features Kiran Abbavaram, Kashmira Pardeshi and Murali Sharma in primary roles.

Plot 
Vishnu is a librarian in Tirupati. Since childhood, he always helps people who are in need. On the other side, Darshana is a YouTuber. Vishnu and Darshana meet each other through the concept of phone number neighbours along with Sharma, Darshana's other number neighbour for a YouTube video. Later, Some unexpected events take place which forms the plot of the story.

Cast

Music 
The film score and soundtrack is composed by Chaitan Bharadwaj. The audio rights were acquired by Aditya Music.

Reception 
123Telugu critic rated the film 3 out of 5 and gave a mixed review stating that, "Vinaro Bhagyamu Vishnu Katha has a decent mix of entertainment and suspense elements. The movie majorly benefits from Kiran Abbavaram’s flawless act, Murali Sharma’s fine performance, and a few good twists. However, the pacing is slow at times and a few portions could have been much better". Sangeetha Devi Dundoo of The Hindu cited the film as "a concoction of absurd ideas" and further stated: "Kiran Abbavaram’s expressions and dialogue delivery remain pretty much the same through the film". Jeevi of Idlebrain gave a rating of 2.75 out of 5 and praised screenplay of climax scenes in the film. He further stated "VBVK is a multi-genre film with an interesting premise".

References

External links 

 

2023 films
2020s Telugu-language films

Indian romantic action films
2023 romance films
2023 action thriller films
Indian action thriller films
Films shot in Andhra Pradesh
Films set in Andhra Pradesh
Films shot in Hyderabad, India